The 2018–19 Uganda Premier League was the 52nd season of the Uganda Premier League, the top-tier football league in Uganda. The season started on 28 September 2018.

KCCA FC won the championship with two games left to play in the home and away season, after drawing 1–1 with Ndejje University.

Participating teams
UPDF, Proline FC and Masavu FC Entebbe were relegated from the 2017–18 Uganda Premier League. They were replaced by Nyamityobora FC, who won the Rwenzori group of the 2017–18 FUFA Big League, Ndejje University, and Paidha Black Angels, who won the promotion playoff. All three promoted teams would be relegated this season.

Some of the Kampala clubs may on occasions also play home matches at the Mandela National Stadium.

League table

References

Ugandan Super League seasons
Uganda
Premier League